Shavano may refer to:
 Mount Shavano, a mountain peak near Salida, Colorado
 Shavano (train), formerly operated by the Denver and Rio Grande Western Railroad
 Shavano Park, Texas
 Shavano Air, an American airline